Grzegorz Marciniszyn (born 22 May 1977) is a retired Polish long jumper.

He finished ninth at the 2001 World Championships. He also competed in the 1997 World Championships, the 1998 European Championships. the 2000 European Indoor Championships, and the 2002 European Indoor Championships without reaching the final. He became Polish champion in 1998, 2000 and 2001, and Polish indoor champion in 1999, 2000, 2001, 2002 and 2003.

His personal best jump was 8.28 metres, achieved in July 2001 in Mals. This is the Polish record.

Competition record

References

1977 births
Living people
Polish male long jumpers
Place of birth missing (living people)